<!-- This long comment was added to the page to prevent it being listed on Special:Shortpages. It and the accompanying monitoring template were generated via Template:Longcomment. Please do not remove the monitor template without removing the comment as well. 
                                                                                                                                               -